Sauropterygia ("lizard flippers") is an extinct taxon of diverse, aquatic reptiles that developed from terrestrial ancestors soon after the end-Permian extinction and flourished during the Triassic before all except for the Plesiosauria became extinct at the end of that period. The plesiosaurs would continue to diversify until the end of the Mesozoic. Sauropterygians are united by a radical adaptation of their pectoral girdle, adapted to support powerful flipper strokes. Some later sauropterygians, such as the pliosaurs, developed a similar mechanism in their pelvis.

Origins and evolution

The earliest sauropterygians appeared about 247 million years ago (Ma), at the start of the Middle Triassic: the first definite sauropterygian with exact stratigraphic datum lies within the Spathian division of the Olenekian era in South China. Early examples were small (around 60 cm), semi-aquatic lizard-like animals with long limbs (pachypleurosaurs), but they quickly grew to be several metres long and spread into shallow waters (nothosaurs). The Triassic-Jurassic extinction event wiped them all out except for the plesiosaurs. During the Early Jurassic, these diversified quickly into both long-necked small-headed plesiosaurs proper, and short-necked large-headed pliosaurs. Originally, it was thought that plesiosaurs and pliosaurs were two distinct superfamilies that followed separate evolutionary paths. It now seems that these were simply morphotypes in that both types evolved a number of times, with some pliosaurs evolving from plesiosaur ancestors, and vice versa.

Classification 

Classification of sauropterygians has been difficult. The demands of an aquatic environment caused the same features to evolve multiple times among reptiles, an example of convergent evolution. Sauropterygians are diapsids, and since the late 1990s, scientists have suggested that they may be closely related to turtles. The bulky-bodied, mollusc-eating placodonts may also be sauropterygians, or intermediate between the classic eosauropterygians and turtles. Several analyses of sauropterygian relationships since the beginning of the 2010s have suggested that they are more closely related to archosaurs (birds and crocodilians) than to lepidosaurs (lizards and snakes).

The cladogram shown hereafter is the result of an analysis of sauropterygian relationships (using just fossil evidence) conducted by Neenan and colleagues, in 2013.

The cladogram shown below follows the most likely result found by an analysis of turtle relationships using both fossil and genetic evidence by M.S. Lee, in 2013. This analysis resolved Sauropterygia as a paraphyletic assemblage of stem turtles.

In cladistic analysis of 2015, Sauropterygia placed within Pantestudines:

Size and ecology
Each morphotype filled a specific ecological role. The large pliosaurs, such as Rhomaleosaurus, Liopleurodon, Pliosaurus, Kronosaurus and Brachauchenius, were the superpredators of the Mesozoic seas, measuring 7 to 12 meters in length, and filled a similar ecological role to that of killer whales today. The long-necked plesiosaurs included Plesiosauridae, Cryptoclididae, and Elasmosauridae. Some lineages of long-necked plesiosaurs evolved progressively longer and more flexible necks, reaching 13 meters in total length by the  late Cretaceous. With their small heads in proportion to their neck length and body mass, long-necked plesiosaurs were limited to eating relatively small fish, which they probably snared in their tooth-lined jaws with rapid lunges of their long necks.

References

External links 
Unit 220: 100: Lepidosauromorpha. Palaeos. July 15, 2003. Retrieved January 19, 2004.
 A review of the Sauropterygia. Adam Stuart Smith. The Plesiosaur Directory. Retrieved April 17, 2006.
 Paleofile taxalist - lists every species and synonyms. Retrieved February 26, 2006

 
Chordate superorders
Early Triassic first appearances
Maastrichtian extinctions